Benign familial neonatal seizures (BFNS), formerly called benign familial neonatal convulsions (BFNC), is a rare autosomal dominant inherited form of seizures. It manifests in newborns, normally within the first 7 days of life, as tonic–clonic seizures. Infants are otherwise normal between attacks and develop without incident. Attacks normally spontaneously cease within the first 15 weeks of life. Lifetime susceptibility to seizures is increased, as 16% of those diagnosed with BFNE earlier in life will go on to have seizures versus a 2% lifetime risk for the general population. There are three known genetic causes of BFNE, two being the voltage-gated potassium channels KCNQ2 (BFNC1) and KCNQ3 (BFNC2) and the third being a chromosomal inversion (BFNC3). There is no obvious correlation between most of the known mutations and clinical variability seen in BFNE.

Signs and symptoms
The only sign of BFNE are seizures, generally tonic-clonic, which occur within the first week of life. Seizures often begin as apnea, cyanosis, and hypertonia and last less than one minute.

People with BFNE are not more likely to develop epileptic seizures later in life.

Pathophysiology

BFNC1
The most prevalent known cause of BFNE is mutation of KCNQ2, a gene encoding a voltage-gated potassium channel (KV7.2). There are at least 35 such mutations, see Table 1, primarily located in the voltage sensitive S4 segment through the C-terminus. Of these mutations, 5 are nonsense mutations, 13 are missense mutations and 11 cause a frameshift in the coding sequence. There are also 5 splice variants, one of which has been characterized at the protein level and leads to a nonsense mutation. Finally, there is one large deletion that removes much of the carboxy-terminus of the channel.

While most BFNC1 mutations have not been further characterized, 14 have and all seem to lead to functional defects. Two of the mutations in the voltage-sensitive S4 segment, R207W and R214W, do not lead to a decrease in the whole-cell current (M current) produced by KCNQ2 channels but to a change in channel kinetics. The R207W mutation takes fourfold longer and the R214W mutation takes twofold longer to reach maximal current compared to wild-type channels. Since the time-course of an action potential is shorter than the time required for mutant KCNQ2 channels to reach proper levels of inactivation these mutants are expected to lead to neuronal hyperexcitability.

Though many of the other characterized mutations lead to decreased whole-cell current that has not been further delineated, three mutations have. Y534fsX538, for example, leads to a truncation that removes much of the carboxy-terminus of the channel. This mutant has been studied and shown to not traffic properly to the membrane. Two other mutations, P709fs929X and W867fsX931, lead to altered carboxy-termini, though they actually lengthen rather than truncate the protein. These abnormal extended proteins have been shown to be more rapidly degraded within cells and, thus, produce little current.

BFNC2
Shortly after the discovery of mutations in KCNQ2 related to BFNE, a novel voltage-gated potassium channel was found that is highly homologous to KCNQ2 and contains mutations also associated with BFNE. This gene, KCNQ3, contains 3 known mutations associated with BFNE, all within the pore region of the channel. The first of these mutations, G310V, leads to a 50% reduction in whole-cell current compared to cells expressing wild-type channels. The reason for this change is unknown as the mutation does not lead to altered protein trafficking.

A second mutation, W309G, has also been found to be associated with BFNE. This mutation was only found in one family and has not been further characterized.

The final known BFNC2 mutation, D305G is also in the pore region of the channel. This mutation leads to an approximately 40% reduction in whole-cell current compared to wild-type expressing cells. The underlying mechanism for this current decrease has not been further delineated.

BFNC3
The rarest cause of BFNE, occurring in only one known family, is a chromosomal inversion. This occurs on chromosome 5 and the inversion is of the p15 through q11 area. Affected individuals, thus, have the karyotype 46,XY,inv(5)(p15q11). Why this inversion leads to the BFNE phenotype is unknown.

Management
Neonatal seizures are often controlled with phenobarbital administration. Recurrent seizures later in life are treated in the standard ways (covered in the main epilepsy article).  Depending on the severity, some infants are sent home with heart and oxygen monitors that are hooked to the child with stick on electrodes to signal any seizure activity.  Once a month the monitor readings are downloaded into a central location for the doctor to be able to read at a future date.  This monitor is only kept as a safeguard as usually the medication wards off any seizures.  Once the child is weaned off the phenobarbital, the monitor is no longer necessary.

History
BFNE was first described in 1964 by Andreas Rett and named by another group four years later. Andreas Rett is better known for his later characterization of Rett syndrome.

References

External links 

Channelopathies
Epilepsy types
Neonatology